This Is My Song is a studio album by American soul singer, Deniece Williams released in 1998 by Harmony Records. The album rose to no. 14 on the Billboard Top Gospel Albums chart. This Is My Song also won a Grammy for Best Contemporary Pop Gospel Album.

Track listing

Album credits 
 Raymel Menefee – producer
 Raina Bundy – executive producer
 Gerard Smerek – sound engineer
 David Bett – art direction
 Tom Coyne – engineer
 Mike Viola – assistant engineer
 Cathie Arquilla – stylist
 Andrew Eccles – photography
 Elaine Good – make-up, hair stylist

Music
 Ray Chew – strings
 Wayne Cobham – horns
 Larry Ferguson – guitar
 Bob Gallo – guitar
 Loris Holland – rhythm
 Steve Moss – percussion

Chart history

References 

1998 albums
Harmony Records albums
Deniece Williams albums
Grammy Award for Best Pop/Contemporary Gospel Album